Last year's champion Rogério Dutra da Silva was not defending his title.

Facundo Argüello won the title, defeating Diego Sebastian Schwartzman in the final, 4–6, 6–0, 6–4.

Seeds

  Blaž Rola (first round)
  Facundo Argüello (champion)
  Guido Pella (first round)
  Horacio Zeballos (second round)
  Diego Sebastian Schwartzman (final)
  Guido Andreozzi (quarterfinals)
  João Souza (semifinals)
  Máximo González (first round)

Draw

Finals

Top half

Bottom half

References
 Main Draw
 Qualifying Draw

Taroii Open de Tenis - Singles
2014 Singles